Île-Royale was a French colony in North America that existed from 1713 to 1763. It consisted of two islands, Île Royale (present day Cape Breton Island, Nova Scotia) and Île Saint-Jean (present day Prince Edward Island). It was ceded to the British Empire after the Seven Years' War, and is today part of Canada.

History
The Treaty of Utrecht, which brought an end to the War of the Spanish Succession, broke the equilibrium that existed in North America between Great Britain and France. This treaty marked the start of the reduction of French royal authority in this region of the world. France recognized the rights of Great Britain on the Hudson Bay region and also ceded continental Acadia, Newfoundland and Saint Pierre and Miquelon. The territory of modern New Brunswick was a source of contention between Great Britain and France for 50 years, which was only to be resolved by the Treaty of Paris in 1763 with the abject surrender of the French.

Article 13 of the Treaty of Utrecht reads: "The Island called Cape Breton and all the others located in the Gulf of Saint Lawrence, will as of this date belong to France...". In Newfoundland, the French kept their rights of fishing and the use of part of the land along the coast to work.

Philippe de Pastour de Costebelle, the French governor of Newfoundland since 1706, became the first governor of Île-Royale and served until 1707. He persuaded the inhabitants of Plaisance in 1714 and those of Saint Pierre and Miquelon to come live on the island. The Acadians refused to swear allegiance to the British crown, and some fled to Île-Royale instead. In 1714, they came to inspect the land and certain families, such as the Costes and the Tillards, decided to establish themselves while others only passed through before settling on Île Saint-Jean. The majority established themselves at St. Peters (renamed Port Toulouse) and situated on the eastern coast of Île-Royale, recreating the Acadian colony. French ships came regularly to fish cod.

Louisbourg was founded in 1713. It was used as a fishing port for cod and a readily defensible harbour, after the Treaty of Utrecht had evicted the French from what is now Nova Scotia and New Brunswick. Louisbourg served peacefully for three decades as seaport for the French colony. A fortress was constructed starting in 1719 to protect French interests in the New World and to serve the seasonal fishing industry. Its geographic position permitted Louisbourg to serve, not only as capital of Île-Royale, but as first line of defence in the 18th century during the wars with Great Britain for the supremacy of North America.

New England colonial troops aided by the British Royal Marines captured the city in 1745 after six weeks of siege. After three years of British governance, Louisbourg was returned to France in the Treaty of Aix-la-Chapelle.

The Minister of Marine appointed Charles des Herbiers de La Ralière as governor in 1748, and Jean-Louis de Raymond in 1751, who was replaced in 1754 by Augustin de Boschenry de Drucour.

Peace was short lived, and on 26 July 1758, after the second Siege of Louisbourg, the French Governor Augustin de Drucourt gave the keys of the city to the British and Edward Boscawen after James Wolfe led one of the greatest assaults in the history of colonial Canada. After that, 4,000 Acadian inhabitants were deported. However, a group of ten families from Port Toulouse fled to Isle Madame where their descendants still live today.

Governors 
Philippe Pastour de Costebelle (1714-1717)
Joseph de Monbeton de Brouillan, dit Saint-Ovide (1717-1739)
Isaac-Louis de Forant (1739-1740)
Jean-Baptiste Prévost du Quesnel (1740-1744)
Louis Du Pont Duchambon de Vergor (1744-1745)
Antoine Le Moyne de Châteauguay (1745)
British occupation:
Charles Knowles (1745-1747)
Peregrine Thomas Hopson (1747-1748)
Charles des Herbiers de La Ralière (1748-1751)
Jean-Louis de Raymond (1751-1753)
 Augustin de Boschenry de Drucour (1754-1758)

References

Acadian history
New France
Acadia
1713 establishments in New France
1763 disestablishments in New France